Elizabeth was launched at Bristol in 1809. She was originally a West Indiaman, but she wrecked in October 1819 at Table Bay while sailing from Bombay to London.

Career
William James, Brice and Co. built Elizabeth at Wapping, but on 3 June 1809 there appeared an advertisement for the sale, at auction, of their stock and trade, including the "hull of a new ship, copper fastened, about 500 tons," etc. Robert Claxton and Sons completed the vessel at Bristol, and she became Elizabeth.

James Drew, jnr. acquired a letter of marque on 28 August. Elizabeth appears in the 1810 volume of Lloyd's Register wit J. Drew, master, Claxton, owner, and trade Bristol—St Vincent. She then continued to trade with the West Indies.

On 2 February 1812 Elizabeth, Drew, master, was on her way from London to St Vincent when she was driven ashore near Dungeness. A boat's crew from the shore came to her assistance and got her off. They left her safe about five miles off the coast. She had lost an anchor and cable, and was proceeding to Portsmouth. She subsequently underwent repairs for damages. From 1813 to 1814 her master was Power.

In September 1814, Claxton & Co. sold Elizabeth at auction to Aston and Company. From 1814 her master was Drew; in 1815 it was Richard Drew.

The Register of Shipping for 1816 shows her master as J. Drew, changing to Cooksley, and her trade as Bristol—St Vincent, changing to London—Ne(illegible). William Cooksley assumed command on 26 June 1815 at Basseterre.

On 12 September 1818 Thomas Harrison took command of Elizabeth in London. On 25 September 1818 her owners sold Elizabeth to the London merchant Edmund Reed. She was then registered in London on 13 October. Harrison sailed Elizabeth to Bombay.

The Register of Shipping for 1820 gives the name of Elizabeths master as Harrison, that of her owner as E. Reed, and her trade as London—Bombay.

Loss
On 7 October 1819 Elizabeth, Harrison, master, was on a voyage from Bombay to London and arrived at Table Bay. As she was turning she ran aground and was subsequently wrecked.

Notes

Citations

References
 
 

1809 ships
Ships built in Bristol
Age of Sail merchant ships
Merchant ships of the United Kingdom
Maritime incidents in 1819